NGC 4306 is a dwarf barred lenticular galaxy located about 100 million light-years away in the constellation Virgo. The galaxy was discovered by astronomer Heinrich d'Arrest on April 16, 1865. Although considered to be a member of the Virgo Cluster, its high radial velocity and similar distance as NGC 4305 suggest that NGC 4306 is a background galaxy. NGC 4306 is a companion of NGC 4305 and appears to be interacting with it.

References

External links

4306
040032
Virgo (constellation)
Astronomical objects discovered in 1865
Dwarf galaxies
07433
Virgo Supercluster
Interacting galaxies
Barred lenticular galaxies